Sinam may refer to:
 Sinam, Taplejung, a village development committee in Taplejung District, Nepal
 Sinam-guyok, a district of Chongjin City, North Korea
 Sinam (2022 film), an Indian Tamil-language crime thriller film
 Sinam, a 2012 film, a version of Yagam
 Sinam station, a railway station on the Gyeongbu Line in South Korea